The President of the Senate of Romania is the senator elected to preside over the Senate meetings. The president of the Senate is also the president of the Standing Bureau of the Senate and the first person in the presidential line of succession.

Electoral system 

The President of the Senate is elected by secret ballot with the majority of votes from the Senators. If none of the candidates obtains the necessary votes, the first two compete again, and the one with most of the votes wins.

Results 
Florin Cîțu defeated Anca Dragu in the November elections for Senate President.

References 

2021 elections in Romania
Senate of Romania